The Canton of Rennes-Sud-Est is a former canton of France, in the Ille-et-Vilaine département. It had 37,247 inhabitants (2012). It was disbanded following the French canton reorganisation which came into effect in March 2015.

The canton comprised the following communes:
 Rennes (partly)
 Chantepie
 Vern-sur-Seiche

References

Former cantons of Ille-et-Vilaine
Canton Rennes Sud Est
2015 disestablishments in France
States and territories disestablished in 2015